Absu's compilation album released in 2005 by Osmose Productions. The vinyl release was limited to 500 copies.

Track listing 
Disc 1
 "The Gold Torques of Uláid"
 "Never Blow Out the Eastern Candle"
 "Stone of Destiny" (Edit Version)
 "Immortal Sorcery"
 "Sumerian Sands (The Silence)"
 "Disembodied"
 "...And Shineth Unto the Cold Cometh (Including Prelusion to Cythrául)
 "Akhera Goiti -- Akhera Beiti (One Black Opalith for Tomorrow)"
 "Reliquiae Celticae"
 "The Great Battle Moving from Ideal to Actual"
 "Old Tombs at Hochdorf"

Disc 2
 "Deathcrush (Including Silvester Anfang)"
 "Swing of the Axe"
 "Transylvania"
 "Bestial Invasion"
 "Winter Zephyr (...Within Kingdoms of Mist)" (Live)
 "Highland Tyrant Attack" (Live)
 "The Thrice Is Greatest to Ninnigal" (Live)
 "The Coming of War" (Live)
 "Book of Splendour" (Rehearsal)
 "Tasseomancy" (Rehearsal)

Credits 
 Disc 1
 Track 1: from the Gummo soundtrack
 Track 2: from World Domination Sampler CD (alternate version)
 Track 3: from Tara (alternate version)
 Tracks 4–6: The Temples of Offal 7-inch demo
 Tracks 7–8: ...And Shineth Unto the Cold Cometh... 7-inch EP
 Tracks 9–11: Hallstattian Swords 7-inch (unreleased EP)

 Disc 2
 Track 1: from Tribute to Mayhem: Originators of the Northern Darkness
 Track 2: from Tribute to Possessed: Seven Gates of Horror
 Track 3: from Tribute to Iron Maiden: A Call to Irons
 Track 4: band rehearsal – May 10, 1996, in Carrollton, Texas
 Track 5: recorded live April 28, 1997, in Toulouse, France
 Track 6: recorded live April 28, 1997, in Toulouse, France
 Track 7: recorded live April 29, 1995, in Torino, Italy
 Track 8: recorded live April 26, 1995, in Essen, Germany
 Track 9: band rehearsal – October 23, 1993, in Dallas, Texas (unreleased track)
 Track 10: band rehearsal – October 31, 1993, in Dallas, Texas (unreleased track)

References 

Absu (band) albums
2005 compilation albums